Franz Fiedler (17 February 1885 in Prostějov, Austria-Hungary – 5 February 1956 in Dresden, GDR) was a photographer.

Fiedler was born in Prostějov, near Olomouc in Moravia. Fiedler was a pupil of Hugo Erfurth. He was regarded as an eccentric during his apprenticeship in Pilsen, and worked in 1905 and again in 1912 with Rudof Dührkoop in Hamburg, and from 1908 to 1911 with Hugo Erfurth in Dresden. At the 1911 world exhibition in Turin he won first prize and had another exhibition in Prague in 1913. He belonged to the circle of Jaroslav Hašek and Egon Erwin Kisch and in 1916 married Erna Hauswald in Dresden where he occupied a studio at Sedanstraße 7.

From 1919, and coincidental with his friendship with Madame d'Ora (Dora Kallmus, of Vienna who was later to move to Paris) he began to work with a 9×12 folding camera and in 1924 became one of the first professional photographers to use a Leica. After expanding his studio in 1925, he took part in the exhibition "Film und Foto" in Stuttgart.

The outstanding publication on the city of Dresden, conceived in the spirit of Die Neue Sachlichkeit, is one of the first illustrated works created according to the new principles of photography. It marks a turning point in his work. To the same series of publications, published by Adolf Behne, belongs 'Berlin in Bildern' by Sasha Stone. That work was the subject of a show at the turn of the year (2006/7) in the Berlinischen Galerie.

Fiedler's studio was destroyed by the Royal Air Force & US Air Force on 13 February 1945. All that was left was a box with photographs for exhibition which was deposited with his family in Moravia. After 1945 he did not have his own studio and earned a living in the GDR as author of books on photography. Anneliese Kretschmer, Dortmund, is one of his pupils.

Publications 
 'Dresden in Bildern', Aufnahmen von Franz Fiedler, herausgegeben von Hans Wolfgang Singer, Wien, Leipzig, Verlag Dr. Hans Epstein, 1930 ('Orbis urbium – Schöne Städte in schönen Bildern').
 Dufek, Antonin, Franz Fiedler, Fotografie/Photographs/Fotografien (Brünn, Prag, 2005)
 Franz Fiedler. Fotografie. Technische Sammlungen der Stadt Dresden, Ausstellung 4.4.-3.6.2007

External links 
  Gallery

1885 births
1956 deaths
People from Prostějov
People from the Margraviate of Moravia
Moravian-German people
Photographers from Dresden